Question 4 may refer to:

 2016 Maine Question 4, An Act to Raise the Minimum Wage
 2016 Massachusetts Question 4, the Massachusetts Legalization, Regulation and Taxation of Marijuana Initiative